The Samarra offensive (March 13 – April 23, 1917) was launched by the British against the Ottomans as part of the Mesopotamian Campaign in World War I.

After Baghdad fell to the British on March 11, 1917, there were still 10,000 Ottoman troops north of the city, led by Khalil Pasha, who could represent a threat to Anglo-Indian forces.

Furthermore, another 15,000 Ottomans under Ali Ihsan Bey were being driven out of Persia by the Russians, and were attempting at joining Khalil's forces in northern Iraq.

Operations began on March 13, carried forth by 45,000 British troops. On March 19, they conquered Fallujah, a crucial step toward the offensive's goal. The British continued their attacks until April 23, when the town of Samarrah and its railroad fell into their hands.

Although it achieved its aims, the Samarrah offensive cost the British about 18,000 casualties, a considerable price (plus another 38,000 who were taken ill).

Further reading
Barker, A. J. The Bastard War: The Mesopotamian Campaign of 1914–1918. New York: Dial Press, 1967.

References

External links
 Samarrah Offensive, 1917

Battles of the Mesopotamian campaign
Battles of World War I involving the Ottoman Empire
Battles of World War I involving the United Kingdom
Battles of World War I involving British India
1917 in Ottoman Iraq
March 1917 events
April 1917 events